Sosnówka Lake is a retention reservoir and reservoir for drinking water  located in the southern part of the Jelenia Góra Valley, Lower Silesian Voivodeship; in Poland. The reservoir has been in use since 2001.

References

Lakes of Poland